Doughboy is a fictional character appearing in American comic books published by Marvel Comics.

Publication history
Doughboy first appeared in Captain America #209 (May 1977), created by Jack Kirby.

Fictional character biography
Doughboy is an artificial lifeform created by Arnim Zola as his servant at Castle Zola in Weisshorn Mountain, Switzerland. Doughboy is a non-humanoid bioform who normally assumes an enormous pie-shaped form with a face consisting of eyes, a mouth, and sometimes a nose, long rubbery arms with only two fingers each, and stalk-like legs with two toes each. His body resembles dough both in appearance and in consistency.

Doughboy was employed by Arnim Zola against Captain America in Zola's first encounter with the Captain.

Years later, Zola merged Doughboy with Primus, who took control of Doughboy and conspired with Baron Zemo against Captain America.

Several years later, Doughboy was separated from Primus, and was again serving Zola. Doughboy fought and defeated Crossbones when they entered Zola's castle. Doughboy later used his shape-shifting powers to mimic an Avengers quinjet during Zola's rescue of the Red Skull and Skeleton Crew. Doughboy next captured Captain America and the Eric Masterson version of Thor at Skullhouse, and took them to the bottom of Devil's Lake on Zola's order. Doughboy was split open and smashed into bits by Masterson.

Doughboy later fought the Thunderbolts when they invaded Zola's base in China.

Powers and abilities
Doughboy is a genetically-engineered bioform created by Arnim Zola. Doughboy is mentally impaired, but possesses a high degree of superhuman strength, durability, and agility. Doughboy possesses an extremely malleable body, enabling him to alter his shape at will. He can alter the color and even the hardness of his body, and once even effectively duplicated the appearance of an Avengers quinjet. He can stretch, deform, expand, compress, and flatten all or part of his body at will. Within certain limits he can use his body to enclose and muffle an explosion and absorb the impact of bullets or other projectiles without harm to himself. His body is highly adhesive and is as viscous as tar. Hence, his body can trap and absorb persons or objects as if it were made of quicksand. Although Doughboy can be injured, his wounds close immediately without bleeding. Doughboy can shed excess body mass at will and apparently can add to his body mass by absorption of organic matter. The Eric Masterson Thor once battered Doughboy to pieces, but it is believed that he was able to reform himself.

Doughboy is capable of self-levitation, allowing flight and subsonic speeds.

Doughboy is not sentient; hence, while he can understand and follow his master's commands, he has no creative intelligence and virtually no will of his own. He is apparently incapable of speech.

In other media
 Doughboy appears in The Avengers: Earth's Mightiest Heroes, voiced by Grant Moninger.
 Doughboy appears in Avengers Assemble. This version hails from Dimension Z and is part of a species of Doughboys.

References

Characters created by Jack Kirby
Comics characters introduced in 1977
Fictional amorphous creatures
Fictional characters who can stretch themselves
Fictional characters with superhuman durability or invulnerability
Fictional genetically engineered characters
Marvel Comics characters who are shapeshifters
Marvel Comics characters who can move at superhuman speeds
Marvel Comics characters with accelerated healing
Marvel Comics characters with superhuman strength
Marvel Comics male supervillains